Sha'ari bin Tadin (2 August 1931 – 13 December 2009) was a Singaporean politician who was the first Member of Parliament (MP) of Malay descent who graduated from a university. He was highly regarded as Cikgu Sha'ari, which translate to "Teacher Sha'ari" in English, for his role as an educator.

Education
Sha'ari was born in Kuala Pilah, Negri Sembilan, Federated Malay States (now Malaysia). He was an ethnic Malay of Minangkabau descent and was the eldest of six siblings. He was educated at the Malay School in Kuala Pilah and completed his primary education in the sixth grade (Darjah 6) during the Japanese occupation of Malaya from 1942–1945.

After the war, Sha'ari completed his primary education in Singapore at Outram School (now Outram Secondary School) in less than three years. He later had his secondary education at Victoria School and on obtaining his Senior Cambridge Certificate, joined the Teachers' Training College (now National Institute of Education) and started his teaching career in 1957.

In February 1977 Sha'ari rejoined the Ministry of Education as an aided Education Officer. That same year he was seconded as Principal of Telok Kurau Secondary School, whilst still serving as a member of parliament. Under his leadership and guidance, the number of 'O' level passes increased at the school.

Upon retiring from politics Sha'ari was posted to the Ministry of Education, Singapore's Public Relations Unit in 1985 until 1987. He also served as a visiting fellow at the Institute of South East Asian Studies (ISEAS) in December 1987.

At the age of 56, Sha'ari obtained a master's degree in Social Sciences in Sociology from the National University of Singapore in 1987.

Career

Education career 
Sha'ari taught in various primary schools between 1954 and 1960. 

In 1961 Sha'ari taught Science to Malay-medium pupils at Siglap Secondary School. A year later he was awarded the Federation Colombo Plan Scholarship to study at the University of Malaya (UM) in Kuala Lumpur, leading up to a Bachelor of Arts (Honours) degree in Malay Studies. While at UM, he was elected President of the Persatuan Kebangsaan Pelajar Islam Malaysia (PKPIM) or National Union of Federation Muslim Students from 1963 to 1965, as well as Executive Committee member of the Masjlis Belia Malaysia or Malaysian Youth Council (MYC) Executive Committee in 1963 and 1964. He was also Deputy Leader of UM's first Student Exchange Programme delegation to Chulalongkorn University, Bangkok in 1963; and part of MYC's delegation to the 5th General Assembly of the World Assembly of Youth (WAY) Conference at University of Massachusetts Amherst, USA.

With a Bachelor of Arts (Honours) degree in Malay Studies, he returned to Singapore in 1965. He taught Malay and Economics (in the Malay language) to the first batch of pre-University Malay-medium pupils at Sang Nila Utama Secondary School, the first Malay secondary school in Singapore. He was also part of the Singapore delegation to the Third Asian Teachers' Leadership Seminar Committee, Permanent Congress of Malay Language and Culture in 1966. Within 2 years at Sang Nila Utama Secondary School, he became Acting Principal in 1967.

Political career
In the mid 1960s newly independent Singapore was facing problems such as mass unemployment, shortage of public housing as well as lack of land and natural resources. The Government's implementation of a large-scale public housing programme caused many residents from largely rural areas to be relocated to various parts of the island. There was a strong need to establish closer rapport with the people, especially in the Malay community and help them understand the need for better public housing.

As one of the first few Singaporean Malay scholars in the 1960s, Sha'ari was approached by the Prime Minister of Singapore, Lee Kuan Yew, to join the People's Action Party (PAP) and to contest in the republic's general elections. Dedicated to teaching and his students, it took much persuasion before Sha'ari agreed to join politics. He strongly believed in a strong foundation in education among the younger generation of citizens, and being in Parliament would enable him to continue his work and do more for the nation.

In February 1968 Sha'ari retired temporarily from Government Service to enable him to stand as a PAP candidate for Kampong Chai Chee in the 1968 Singapore General Elections. Returning unopposed with over 75 percent of votes, Sha'ari became Member of Parliament for Kampong Chai Chee.

In May 1968, Sha'ari was appointed Parliamentary Secretary to the Minister for Culture. He spent time and energy with the people, grassroots leaders and residents in his constituency to better understand their concerns and to be able to help them understand the need for building a better future for Singapore.

Within four years in office, Sha'ari he was promoted to Senior Parliamentary Secretary (Culture) in 1972. He had also temporarily performed the duties of Parliamentary Secretary (Education) before the 1972 General Elections.

During his tenure at the Ministry of Culture, he was instrumental in the promotion of arts and culture of Singapore and its introduction overseas. In 1969, he founded Majlis Pusat (Pertubuhan-Pertubuhan Budaya Melayu) or Central Council of Malay Cultural Organisations, and became its patron until 1987. He helped to establish the National Dance Company (now Singapore Dance Theatre), which made its debut in the Adelaide Festival of Arts in 1972. He led cultural delegations to Indonesia, the Soviet Union, Tehran and South Korea. He was leader of the Singapore contingent at the 1974 Asian Games in Tehran. He was also a special guest of the Governments of West Germany, Japan and France in 1972, 1974, 1975 respectively.

Bedok became a constituency in 1976 under the charge of Sha'ari, who formed the Citizens' Consultative Committee. That same year he contested in the General Elections in Bedok constituency and was returned with a majority vote of nearly 75 percent.

Other senior appointments 
 Founder, Chairman of Advisory Board & Patron, Majlis Pusat, 1969–1987.
 Vice-President, Singapore Sports Council, 1974–1982.
 Ex-Co Member, Asian Games Federation (now Olympic Council of Asia), 1974–1982.
 President, Singapore Amateur Cycling Association, 1977–1988.
 Member of Executive Board, Singapore National Olympic Council (SNOC), 1970s.
 President, Taman Bacaan (Singapore Malay Youth Library Association), 1970s.
 Chief Patron, Japanese Cultural Society, SIngapore, 1970s.
 Adviser of Regional Youth Council (East), People's Association, 1970s.
 Chairman of Organising Committee, Summer Scholarship, Japan (Asian students), 1970s.

Awards
Sha'ari received the Anugerah Jasawan (Meritorious Award) by Majlis Pusat in 1984. The Singapore Government has also accorded him the Pingat Bakti Setia (Excellent Service Award) for his commitment and contribution to public service.

Death
Sha'ari died of heart failure at his home on 13 December 2009 at 12:25 p.m.

See also
 Malays in Singapore
 Members of the Singapore Parliament

References
 
 Cornelius-Takahama, Vernon (1999). Kampong Chai Chee. Singapore: National Library Board Singapore
 Tan, Sumiko (1993). Chai Chee revisited. Singapore: Kampong Chai Chee CCC

1931 births
2009 deaths
Minangkabau people
Singaporean people of Minangkabau descent
Singaporean people of Malay descent
People from Negeri Sembilan
Malaysian emigrants to Singapore
People who lost Malaysian citizenship
Naturalised citizens of Singapore
People with Parkinson's disease
People's Action Party politicians
Singaporean educators
Singaporean Muslims
Victoria School, Singapore alumni
National University of Singapore alumni
Members of the Parliament of Singapore